Lewis Locke (born Louis Tacy) (November 5, 1835 - January 4, 1920) was a Private in the Union Army and a Medal of Honor recipient for his actions in the American Civil War.

Locke joined the 1st New Jersey Cavalry in October 1864, and mustered out with his regiment in July 1865.

Medal of Honor citation
Rank and organization: Private, Company A, 1st New Jersey Cavalry. Place and date: At Paines Crossroads, Va., April 5, 1865. Entered service at: Trenton, N.J. Birth: Clintonville, N.Y. Date of issue: May 3, 1865.

Citation:

Capture of a Confederate flag.

See also

List of American Civil War Medal of Honor recipients: G–L

References

 

1892 deaths
United States Army Medal of Honor recipients
Union Army soldiers
People from Clinton County, New York
People of New York (state) in the American Civil War
American Civil War recipients of the Medal of Honor
1835 births